Steam Days is a 1986 BBC Two television documentary series written and presented by Miles Kington. Each episode is themed around the history of British steam locomotives and railways, particularly highlighting preserved locomotives operating at the time of its filming. The series consists of six half-hour episodes. It aired on Public Television stations in the United States under the title Great Steam Trains. Two episodes, "Going Great Western" and "The Fishing Line" are available to watch on the BBC Archives website. The whole series subsequently became available to watch on the BBC iPlayer. but until 8 December 2017 and is currently not available.

Episode list

VHS releases

DVD releases

See also
The Train Now Departing

References

External links 

 Steam Days at the British Film Institute

1986 British television series debuts
1986 British television series endings
1980s British documentary television series
BBC television documentaries
British travel television series
English-language television shows